Mount Lepanto is a major peak,  high, situated  southeast of Mount Freeman in the Victory Mountains of Victoria Land, Antarctica. It was named by the New Zealand Geological Survey Antarctic Expedition (NZGSAE), 1957–58, after the Battle of Lepanto of 1571, and is one of a group of associated names in this area given by the NZGSAE.

References

Mountains of Victoria Land
Borchgrevink Coast